STX Corporation (Hangul: 에스티엑스) is a publicly held South Korean holding company engaged in the provision of trading services. Headquartered in Gyeongsangnamdo, South Korea, the company operates its business through two divisions: trade and ship maintenance. Its trade business division provides shipping and energy materials such as coal, oil, steel and others. Its ship maintenance business offers cargo management, marine technical, insurance, crew management and other related services.

The company had five local subsidiaries including STX Offshore & Shipbuilding, STX Engine, STX Heavy Industries, STX PanOcean and STX Energy.

STX Offshore & Shipbuilding was the world's fourth largest shipbuilder and in 2008 acquired Norwegian shipbuilder Aker Yards, in order to diversify their product line.

STX business areas
 Trading business

References

External links

 STX Corporation
 Gyeongnam FC—K-League Pro-Soccer Team

South Korean companies established in 1976
Companies based in Changwon
Conglomerate companies established in 1976
Holding companies established in 1976
Holding companies of South Korea
Manufacturing companies established in 1976
Multinational companies headquartered in South Korea
Shipbuilding companies of South Korea
South Korean brands